Carl Fredrik von Saltza (October 29, 1858 – December 10, 1905) was a Swedish-American artist and portrait painter. Saltza was best known in Sweden for his genre pictures in watercolor and for his drawings. He was one of the main illustrators for the 1893 edition of the Poetic Edda by Fredrik Sander (1828–1900). In the United States, Saltza was best known for his portraits.

Life
Carl von Saltza was born in the parish of Sörby in Östergötland, Sweden to Count Carl Anton Philips von Saltza and Countess Gustava Christina De la Gardie in 1858. Saltza received his early education in private schools in Uppsala and Stockholm, Sweden, and subsequently went on to study painting in the Royal Academy in Stockholm where he studied under Edvard Perséus. There he studied under Georg von Rosen and August Malmström. Dissatisfied with the teaching, Saltza traveled abroad with his friend Karl Nordström and continued his studies at the Royal Academy in Brussels, Belgium, and under private teachers in Paris, France, including Jean-Léon Gérôme.

Upon his return to Sweden Saltza associated himself with the group of artists who formed an artists' association known as Konstnärsförbundet in 1886. The conflict between the Royal Swedish Academy of Arts and Konstnärsförbundet contributed to von Saltza's decision to emigrate to the United States in 1891. Saltza was an instructor in painting in St. Louis, Missouri, from 1892 to 1898 and at the Chicago Art Institute in Chicago, Illinois, from 1898 to 1899. In 1899 to 1901, von Saltza was an instructor at the Teachers' College at Columbia University in Manhattan, New York City. Later in life, von Saltza painted portraits in Cleveland, Ohio. He died in St. Luke's Hospital in New York City in 1905.
Saltza married Henrietta Stoopendahl (1863–1905) in 1883 in Stockholm. They were the parents of artist Philip W. von Saltza. His daughter, Elisabeth Christina von Saltza married Columbia professor George Philip Krapp.

Gallery

References

Other sources
American Federation of Arts (1908). American Art Directory. R.R. Bowker.
Hamersly, Lewis Randolph (Editor) (1905). Who's who in New York City and State. L.R. Hamersly Co.
Johansson, Ulla (2000–2002). "von Saltza" in Svenskt biografiskt lexikon vol. 31, pp. 316–319. Stockholm.
Söderberg, Rolf (1949). "Saltza, Carl Fredrik von" in Svenska män och kvinnor, vol. 6, pp. 482–483. Stockholm.

External links
Illustrations from Frederk Sanders' Edda Sämund den Vises

1858 births
1905 deaths
19th-century Swedish painters
Swedish male painters
20th-century Swedish painters
von Saltza, Carl F
Swedish emigrants to the United States
19th-century Swedish male artists
20th-century Swedish male artists